Rino Zampilli (born 7 March 1984 in Venafro) is an Italian former professional cyclist.

Major results
2009
 Tour of Romania
1st Stages 2 & 4
 1st Stage 2 Tour of Szeklerland
 2nd Banja Luka–Belgrade

References

External links
 
 
 

1984 births
Living people
Italian male cyclists
Sportspeople from the Province of Isernia